Eva-Maria Ittner (born 21 September 1961) is a German fencer. She competed in the women's individual and team épée events at the 1996 Summer Olympics.

References

External links
 

1961 births
Living people
German female fencers
Olympic fencers of Germany
Fencers at the 1996 Summer Olympics
Sportspeople from Düsseldorf
20th-century German women